The Lovers of Verona is a 1949 French romantic drama mystery film co-written and directed by André Cayatte, loosely based on the William Shakespeare play Romeo and Juliet. The film was a joint project of 
screenwriter Jacques Prevert and director Cayatte and enjoyed great international success. It was released in Italy in 1949, then internationally in 1951.

Plot
Shortly after World War II, Angelo, a glassblower from Murano, and Georgia Maglia, the daughter of a fascist magistrate, are cast as stand-ins for the stars of a film version of Romeo and Juliet being shot on location in Venice. Inevitably they fall in love and their affair parallels the Shakespeare tragedy. The principal difficulty is the scheming of Rafaële, the Magia family's ruthless consigliere. In the end, Angelo is killed and Georgia dies at his side.

Cast
 Serge Reggiani as Angelo (Romeo)
 Anouk Aimée as Georgia (Juliet)
 Martine Carol as Bettina Verdi, the star of the film
 Pierre Brasseur as Rafaële
 Marcel Dalio as Amedeo Maglia
 Marianne Oswald as Laetitia
 René Génin as the guardian of the tomb
 Yves Deniaud as Ricardo, an actor
 Charles Blavette as the head of the glassworks
 Marcel Pérès as Domini, a glassblower

Production
The film was shot at the Billancourt Studios in Paris and on location in Venice. The sets were designed by art director René Moulaert.

In his memoirs, cinematographer Henri Alekan recalled when 16-years-old Anouk Aimée was forced to dive completely naked into the cold waters of the Adige river, without anyone managing to keep away the onlookers obviously interested in the scene.

Critical reception
TV Guide called the film "[a]n intriguing romance", while Bosley Crowther of The New York Times called it "a story set within a weird and grotesque frame of contemporary morbidness in Venice and gaudy film-making in Italy." Pauline Kael wrote, "The film's sensuous poetic elegance contrasts with the seamy elements it encompasses... You may feel you've been made too aware of the film's artistic intentions, and the romanticism can drive you a little nuts."

References

External links
 
 
 The Lovers of Verona at Fandango

1949 films
1949 romantic drama films
French mystery films
1940s French films
1940s French-language films
Films based on Romeo and Juliet
Films directed by André Cayatte
Films produced by Raymond Borderie
Films scored by Joseph Kosma
Films set in Venice
Films shot at Billancourt Studios
Films shot in Venice
Films with screenplays by Jacques Prévert
French black-and-white films
French romantic drama films